Marhabah is a sub-district located in Dhi Bin District, 'Amran Governorate, Yemen. Marhabah had a population of 13890 according to the 2004 census.

References 

Sub-districts in Dhi Bin District